Alon Livné is an Israeli fashion designer. He was born as an only child in Tel Aviv to Jewish parents with an Egyptian background, his mother being a hairdresser and his father a businessman. 

 
Livné started his career at fashion houses Roberto Cavalli and Alexander McQueen (brand), before participating in the Israeli TV show Project Runway Israel.

Livné later started his own self-titled ready-to-wear line, worn by celebrities such as Lady Gaga, Naomi Campbell, Kim Kardashian and Paris Hilton. In 2013, Livne showed his work at the New York Fashion Week for the first time, and showcased his works there until 2016.

In May 2013, Beyoncé commissioned Livné to design outfits for her The Mrs. Carter Show World Tour.

Livné's Spring/Summer 2017 Collection was presented in Paris during the Paris Fashion Week, marking the first time an Israeli brand was scheduled. It was mostly well received by the international press.

Alon Livne White
Alon Livné's bridal line, "Alon Livné White", is sold internationally. A presentation of the collection is held bi-annually during Bridal Fashion Week in New York City.

See also
 Israeli fashion
 Project Runway Israel
 List of fashion designers

References 

High fashion brands
Living people
Israeli fashion designers
Israeli Jews
LGBT fashion designers
Year of birth missing (living people)
Reality show winners
Project Runway
21st-century LGBT people